Wright Township is one of fifteen townships in Greene County, Indiana, USA.  As of the 2010 census, its population was 3,921.

History
The Shakamak State Park Historic District was listed on the National Register of Historic Places in 2000.

Geography

Cities and towns
 Jasonville

Unincorporated towns
 Antioch
 Gilmour
 Midland
 Midland Junction
 Redcuff Corner
 Vicksburg
(This list is based on USGS data and may include former settlements.)

Adjacent townships
 Lewis Township, Clay County (north)
 Smith Township (east)
 Grant Township (southeast)
 Stockton Township (south)
 Cass Township, Sullivan County (west)
 Jackson Township, Sullivan County (northwest)

Cemeteries
The township contains three cemeteries: Bethel, Frye and Terhune.

Major highways

Airports and landing strips
 Shakamak Airport

References
 U.S. Board on Geographic Names (GNIS)
 United States Census Bureau cartographic boundary files

External links
 Indiana Township Association
 United Township Association of Indiana

Townships in Greene County, Indiana
Bloomington metropolitan area, Indiana
Townships in Indiana